Mackenzie W. Mathis, is an American neuroscientist and principal investigator at the École Polytechnique Fédérale de Lausanne. Her lab investigates adaptive mechanisms in biological and artificial intelligence to inform adaptive AI systems and translational research in neurological diseases.

Early life and education 
Mathis conducted her undergraduate education at the University of Oregon receiving a bachelors of science in 2007. She then worked as a senior research technician and lab manager at the Project A.L.S. Laboratory for Stem Cell Research at Columbia University from 2007 to 2012. Working under the mentorship of Dr. Christopher E. Henderson and Dr. Hynek Wichterle, Mathis modelled amyotrophic lateral sclerosis (A.L.S.) using stem cell-derived motor neurons. During her time in the lab, she published two first author scientific papers, one in the Journal of Neuroscience which offered a novel protocol for generating human limb-innervating neural subtypes in vitro for use in neurological disease research, and the other in Nature Biotechnology on benchmarking iPS stem cell lines ability to make motor neurons. Mathis then moved to Boston and joined the graduate program in molecular and cellular biology (MCB) at Harvard University. On her way to completing her PhD, she also completed a master's degree. During her PhD, Mathis conducted research on the neural circuits underlying reward prediction errors under the mentorship of Professor Naoshige Uchida at the Harvard Center for Brain Science. In her first year as a graduate student, Mathis received an National Science Foundation Fellowship to fund her graduate research. Mathis was able to merge her interests in motor control with Uchida's expertise in neural recordings and behavioral analysis to forge a new scientific direction in the lab and publish a first author paper in Neuron by the end of her PhD regarding the essential role played by the somatosensory cortex in forelimb motor adaptation in rodents. Near the end of her PhD Mathis was awarded the Rowland Fellowship which provided five years of funding to start her own lab at Harvard's Rowland Institute in Cambridge, MA. Prior to founding the Mathis Lab at Harvard, Mathis was also awarded the Women & the Brain (WATB) Fellowship for Advancement in Brain Science which provided her with the funding to work in Germany in the summer of 2017 under the mentorship of Professor Matthias Bethge at the University of Tübingen. In her postdoctoral work, Mathis focused on pioneering deep learning tools for neural and behavioral analysis which served as a critical step towards her independent career.

Career and research 
In 2017, Mathis started her lab at the Rowland Institute at Harvard University with a goal of reverse engineering neural circuits that drive adaptive motor behavior. Through large-scale neural recordings and building novel robotic and machine learning tools, the Mathis Lab probes neural circuits and analyzes behavioral outputs to better understand how brain function relates to behavior. Mathis is dedicated to the concept of open science and as such, the novel deep learning tool she designed is open access such that researchers worldwide have access to the code in order to use this tool to analyze animal behaviors in an unbiased and precise way to inform a better understanding of how neural activity drives specific behaviors. The deep learning tool designed by Mathis is called DeepLabCut which relies on transfer learning to optimize an existing trained neural network to a desired new dataset after sufficient training. Mathis has shown the versatility of this tool on many diverse datasets highlighting the robust design and potential for wide use in fields even beyond neuroscience. Her work has been featured in Nature, Bloomberg Business Week, and The Atlantic.

As of August 2020, Mathis moved to the Swiss Federal Institute of Technology, working within the Brain Mind Institute, Center for Intelligent Systems & Center for Neuroprosthetics as a tenure-track Professor. The lab is hosted at the Campus Biotech in Geneva, Switzerland, where Mathis holds the Bertarelli Foundation Chair of Integrative Neuroscience.

Awards and honors 
 2022: FENS  EJN Young Investigator Prize 
 2020: Bertarelli Foundation Chair of Integrative Neuroscience 
 2019 - 2023: CZI Essential Open Source Software for Science - grant for DeepLabCut 
 2019 - : ELLIS Society Fellow, Natural Intelligence 
 2018: Mind, Brain & Behavior Harvard University Faculty Award 
 2018: eLife Travel Grant Award Winner 
 2017: NVIDIA GPU Grant
 2017 - 2022: Rowland Fellowship
 2017: Women & the Brain Fellowship for Advancement of Neuroscience
 2013 - 2018: National Science Foundation Graduate Research Fellowship Life Sciences – Neuroscience
 2013, ’14, ’16: Harvard University Certificate of Distinction in Teaching (MCB80, MCB145)
 2014: Dr. Ernest Peralta Fund Award for Best Qualifying Exam proposal & defense, Harvard
 2012 - 2013: Morris E. Zukerman Graduate Fellowship - awarded to top students in brain sciences at Harvard GSAS

Publications

Personal life 
Mathis is married to neuroscientist Dr. Alexander Mathis who is an assistant professor at the Swiss Federal Institute of Technology.

References 

Living people
Year of birth missing (living people)
American neuroscientists
University of Oregon alumni
Harvard University alumni
Harvard University faculty
Academic staff of the École Polytechnique Fédérale de Lausanne